The list of shipwrecks in December 1846 includes ships sunk, foundered, wrecked, grounded, or otherwise lost during December 1846.

1 December

2 December

3 December

4 December

5 December

6 December

7 December

8 December

9 December

10 December

11 December

12 December

13 December

14 December

15 December

16 December

17 December

18 December

19 December

20 December

21 December

22 December

23 December

24 December

25 December

26 December

27 December

28 December

29 December

30 December

31 December

Unknown date

References

1846-12
 
December 1846 events